Harold John Winberg (25 May 1918 – 18 May 1981) was an Australian rules footballer who played with Fitzroy and North Melbourne in the Victorian Football League (VFL).

Notes

External links 

1918 births
1981 deaths
Australian rules footballers from Melbourne
Fitzroy Football Club players
North Melbourne Football Club players
People from Lilydale, Victoria